In Classical Greek mythology, Hippolyta, or Hippolyte (Hippolytē) was a daughter of Ares and Otrera, queen of the Amazons, and a sister of Antiope and Melanippe. She wore her father Ares' zoster, the Greek word found in the Iliad and elsewhere meaning "war belt." Some traditional English translations have preferred the more feminine-sounding "girdle." Hippolyta figures prominently in the myths of both Heracles and Theseus. The myths about her are varied enough that they may therefore be about several different women.

The name Hippolyta comes from Greek roots meaning "horse" and "let loose."

Legends

Ninth Labor of Heracles 
In the myth of Heracles, Hippolyta's belt (ζωστὴρ Ἱππολύτης) was the object of his ninth labour. He was sent to retrieve it for Admete, the daughter of King Eurystheus. Most versions of the myth indicate that Hippolyta was so impressed with Heracles that she gave him the belt without argument, perhaps while visiting him on his ship. Then, according to Pseudo-Apollodorus, the goddess Hera, making herself appear as one of the Amazons, spread a rumour among them that Heracles and his crew were abducting their queen, so the Amazons attacked the ship. In the fray that followed, Heracles slew Hippolyta, stripped her of the belt, fought off the attackers, and sailed away.

Adventure of Theseus 
In the myth of Theseus, the hero joined Heracles in his expedition, or went on a separate expedition later, and was actually the one who had the encounter with Hippolyta. Some versions say he abducted her, some that Heracles did the abducting but gave her to Theseus as spoils, and others say that she fell in love with Theseus and betrayed the Amazons by willingly leaving with him. In any case, she was taken to Athens where she was wed to Theseus. In some renditions the other Amazons became enraged at the marriage and attacked Athens. This was the Attic War, in which they were defeated by Athenian forces under Theseus or Heracles. In other renditions Theseus later put Hippolyta aside to marry Phaedra. So Hippolyta rallied her Amazons to attack the wedding ceremony. When the defenders closed the doors on the attackers, either Hippolyta was killed, Theseus directly killed her in the fight, she was accidentally killed by another Amazon, Molpadia, while fighting by Theseus' side, or was accidentally killed by her sister Penthesilea during this battle or in a separate incident. This killer was in turn slain by Theseus or Achilles. Some stories paint Theseus in a more favorable light, saying that Hippolyta was dead before he and Phaedra were wed, and this battle did not occur. Further complicating the narratives, a number of ancient writers say the Amazon in question was not Hippolyta at all, but her sister Antiope, Melanippe, or Glauce. Moreover, there are combined versions of the tale in which Heracles abducts and kills Hippolyta while Theseus, assisted by Sthenelus and Telamon, abducts and marries Antiope. There are also stories that Hippolyta or Antiope later bore Theseus a son, Hippolytus of Athens.

Shakespeare character 

In William Shakespeare's A Midsummer Night's Dream, Hippolyta is engaged to Theseus, the duke of Athens. In Act I, Scene 1 she and he discuss their fast-approaching wedding, which will take place under the new moon in four days (I.i.2). Theseus declares to Hippolyta that, although he "wooed her with his sword," he will wed her "with pomp, with triumph, and with revelling" and promises to begin a celebration that will continue until the wedding (I.i.19).

The characterization of Hippolyta in A Midsummer Night's Dream (as well as that of Theseus), like many other mytho-historical characters found in Shakespeare's plays, is based on ancient biographical accounts found in Plutarch's work Parallel Lives. In The Life of Theseus, according to Plutarch, it was Hippolyta who concluded a four month long war between Athens and the Amazons with a peace treaty, resulting in the marriage between Theseus and Hippolyta. The dramatic representation of Hippolyta and Theseus in A Midsummer Night's Dream, however, is entirely a product of the playwright's imagination.

The character of Hippolyta also appears in The Two Noble Kinsmen, a play co-written by Shakespeare and John Fletcher.

Classical literature sources 
Chronological listing of classical literature sources for Hippolyte's belt:

 Homer, Iliad 2. 649 ff (trans. Murray) (Greek epic poetry C8th BC)
 Euripides, Heracles Mad, 408 ff (trans. Coleridge) (Greek tragedy C5th BC)
 Euripides, Ion, 1143 ff (trans. Way)
 Euripides, Heracleidae, 214 ff (trans. Coleridge)
 Herodotus, Herodotus 4. 9-10 (trans. Godley) (Greek history C5th BC)
 Herodotus, Herodotus 4. 82
 Apollonius Rhodius, The Argonautica 2. 750 ff (trans. Coleridge) (Greek epic poetry C3rd BC)
 Apollonius Rhodius, The Argonautica 2. 777 ff
 Apollonius Rhodius, The Argonautica 2. 966 ff
 Lycophron, Alexandria 1327 ff (trans. Mair) (Greek epic poetry C3rd BC)
 Diodorus Siculus, Library of History 2. 46. 3-4 (trans. Oldfather) (Greek history C1st BC)
 Diodorus Siculus, Library of History 4. 16. 1-4
 Philippus of Thessalonica, The Twelve Labors of Hercules (The Greek Classics ed. Miller Vol 3 1909 p. 397) (Greek epigram C1st AD)
 Seneca, Agamemnon 848 ff (trans. Miller) (Roman tragedy C1st AD)
 Seneca, Hercules Furens 245 ff (trans. Miller)
 Seneca, Hercules Furens 542 ff
 Seneca, Hercules Oetaeus 21 ff (trans. Miller)
 Seneca, Hercules Oetaeus 1183 ff
 Seneca, Hercules Oetaeus 1450 ff
 Seneca, Hercules Oetaeus 1894 ff
 Plutarch, Theseus 26 ff (trans. Perrin) (Greek history C1st to C2nd AD)
 Pseudo-Apollodorus, The Library 2. 5. 9 (trans. Frazer) (Greek mythography C2nd AD)
 Pausanias, Description of Greece 5. 10. 9 (trans. Jones) (Greek travelogue C2nd AD)
 Pseudo-Hyginus, Fabulae 30 (trans. Grant) (Roman mythography C2nd AD)
 Quintus Smyrnaeus, Fall of Troy 6. 240 ff (trans. Way) (Greek epic poetry C4th AD)
 Nonnus, Dionysiaca 25. 148 ff (trans. Rouse) (Greek epic poetry C5th AD)
 Nonnos, Dionysiaca 25. 242 ff
 Tzetzes, Chiliades or Book of Histories 2. 309 ff (trans. Untila et al.) (Grec-Byzantine history C12 AD)
 Tzetzes, Chiliades or Book of Histories 2. 497 ff

References

External links
 

 
Labours of Hercules
Queens of the Amazons
Children of Ares
Characters in A Midsummer Night's Dream
Female Shakespearean characters
Theseus
Deeds of Hera